Ponda Assembly constituency is one of the 40 Goa Legislative Assembly constituencies of the state of Goa in southern India. Ponda is also one of the 20 constituencies falling under the South Goa Lok Sabha constituency.

Members of Legislative Assembly

Election results

2022

2017 result

2012 result

2007 results

See also
 List of constituencies of the Goa Legislative Assembly
 North Goa district

References

Footnotes

External links
  

North Goa district
Assembly constituencies of Goa